Sterling Dupree Gibbs (born July 17, 1993) is an American professional basketball player for Twarde Pierniki Toruń of the Polish Basketball League (PLK). He played college basketball at Texas, Seton Hall and Connecticut.

Early life and high school
Gibbs was born and grew up in Scotch Plains, New Jersey and attended Seton Hall Preparatory School. He was a standout basketball player for the Pirates and averaged 20.8 points, 4.2 assists and 1.8 steals per game during his senior season and was named First Team All-State as Seton Hall won the Essex County Tournament championship. He was listed as a three star recruit and one of the 150 best college prospects in his class by major scouting services. Gibbs initially committed to play basketball at the University of Maryland, but decommitted after the retirement of coach Gary Williams and accepted a scholarship to the University of Texas.

College career

Texas
Gibbs played one season for the Longhorns, averaging 2.6 points and 7.5 minutes played in 30 games. He announced after his freshman season that he would be transferring to Seton Hall University to be closer to his family.

Seton Hall
After sitting out the 2012–2013 season due to NCAA transfer rules, Gibbs averaged 13.2 points per game in his first season with the Pirates. At the beginning of the season, Gibbs was named the MVP of the 2014 Paradise Jam Tournament, after scoring 40 points against Illinois State in the tournament final. As a redshirt junior season, averaged 16.3 points, 3.8 assists and shot 43.6 percent on three-pointers and was named second team All-Big East Conference. During the season, Gibbs ejected from a February 16 game for striking Villanova guard Ryan Arcidiacono in the face with his elbow and was suspended a further two games by Seton Hall. After the season, Gibbs announced he was leaving the Seton Hall program and ultimately transferred to Connecticut.

Connecticut
In his final season of eligibility, Gibbs averaged 12.3 points and shot 38.7 percent on three-pointers as the Huskies went on to win the 2016 American Athletic Conference tournament.

Professional career
After going unselected in the 2016 NBA draft, Gibbs played for the Washington Wizards NBA Summer League, averaging 4.5 points, 1.3 rebounds and 2.5 assists over the course of four games. He was then selected by the Windy City Bulls in the second round of the 2016 NBA Development League draft, but was waived by the team.

Egis Körmend
Gibbs signed with Egis Körmend of the Hungarian Nemzeti Bajnokság I/A (NB I/A) in December 2016. Gibbs averaged 14.4 points, 2.1 rebounds, and 3.3 assists over 27 NB I/A games as Körmend reached the semifinals of the 2017 Hungarian Cup playoffs and 15.2 points and 3.6 assists in the 2016–17 FIBA Europe Cup.

Indios de San Francisco
Gibbs played for the Indios de San Francisco de Macorís of the Dominican Republic's Liga Nacional de Baloncesto during the summer of 2017, where he played with his brother Ashton.

Nizhny Novgorod
Gibbs signed a two-year contract with BC Nizhny Novgorod of the Russian VTB United League on August 9, 2017. Gibbs only appeared in two games for Nizhny, both in the team's 2017–18 Basketball Champions League qualifiers, and averaged two points per game.

Kaposvári KK
Gibbs returned to Hungary after signing with Kaposvári KK on June 1, 2018. Gibbs averaged 20.7 points, 2.6 rebounds, 3.6 assists and 1.3 steals over 20 games with the team.

Kolossos Rodou
Gibbs signed with Kolossos Rodou B.C. of the Greek Basket League on October 15, 2018. He averaged 11.7 points, 1.9 rebounds and 2.7 assists in nine games before leaving the team.

Nantes
Gibbs signed with Hermine Nantes Atlantique of the French LNB Pro B on February 4, 2019. He averaged 15.3 points, 2.4 rebounds, and 2.9 assists in 18 games (six starts) for Nantes.

Inter Bratislava
Browning signed with Inter Bratislava of the Slovak Extraliga on September 14, 2019. Gibbs was waived by Inter Bratislava on October 2, 2019 after playing in two Champions League qualifying games, averaging 13 points per game.

Koper Primorska
Gibbs signed with Koper Primorska of the Slovenian League on January 7, 2020. Gibbs averaged 12.0 points, 3.4 rebounds and 2.4 assists in five Slovenian League games and was a member of the team's Slovenian Cup championship squad and averaged 12.5 points, 2.2 rebounds and 2.2 assists in six Adriatic League games before the league was suspended due to COVID-19. Gibbs was re-signed by Koper Primorska on July 27, 2020.

Antwerp Giants
On December 26, 2020, he has signed with Antwerp Giants of the Pro Basketball League (PBL). Gibbs averaged 16.5 points and 4.5 assists per game.

ERA Nymburk
On August 3, 2021, Gibbs signed with ERA Nymburk of the Czech National Basketball League.

Twarde Pierniki Toruń
On October 26, 2022, he has signed with Twarde Pierniki Toruń of the Polish Basketball League (PLK).

Personal life
Gibbs is the son of Temple and Jacqueline Gibbs, and has two brothers, Ashton and Temple, Jr. "T.J.", who both also played basketball for Seton Hall Prep. Ashton played college basketball at Pittsburgh and professionally for several overseas teams and T.J. played for Notre Dame. His father played football at Temple University.

Gibbs is married with one child.

References

External links
Texas Longhorns bio
Seton Hall Pirates bio
Connecticut Huskies bio
College Statistics at Sports-Reference.com
RealGM Profile
EuroBasket Profile

1993 births
Living people
American expatriate basketball people in Belgium
American expatriate basketball people in the Dominican Republic
American expatriate basketball people in France
American expatriate basketball people in Greece
American expatriate basketball people in Hungary
American expatriate basketball people in Russia
American expatriate basketball people in Slovakia
American expatriate basketball people in Slovenia
American men's basketball players
Antwerp Giants players
Basketball players at the 2010 Summer Youth Olympics
Basketball players from New Jersey
BC Körmend players
BC Nizhny Novgorod players
BK Inter Bratislava players
Kaposvári KK players
Kolossos Rodou B.C. players
People from Scotch Plains, New Jersey
Point guards
Seton Hall Pirates men's basketball players
Seton Hall Preparatory School alumni
Sportspeople from Union County, New Jersey
Texas Longhorns men's basketball players
Twarde Pierniki Toruń players
UConn Huskies men's basketball players